Freeway is a 1996 American black comedy crime film written and directed by Matthew Bright and produced by Oliver Stone. It stars Kiefer Sutherland, Reese Witherspoon and Brooke Shields. The film's plot is a dark take on the fairy tale "Little Red Riding Hood".

The film received favorable reviews, but did poorly at the box office.

Plot
Vanessa Lutz is an illiterate teenager living south of Los Angeles. Her mother, Ramona, is arrested in a prostitution sting, and her stepfather, Larry, is taken in on drug and child abuse charges. Social worker Mrs. Sheets comes to take Vanessa away, but she handcuffs the social worker to a bed and runs away.

Taking Mrs. Sheets' run-down car, Vanessa plans to go live with her grandmother in Stockton. Along the way, she stops to see her boyfriend Chopper Wood, a local gang member, to tell him about her trip. He gives her a gun to sell upon arriving at her destination. Minutes after Vanessa leaves, he is killed in a drive-by shooting. Later, Bob Wolverton, a counselor at a school for boys with emotional problems, picks her up on the side of the highway when the car breaks down. He offers to take her as far as L.A., where he is headed.

Over the long drive, Vanessa comes to trust Bob, and confesses to him the details of her painfully dysfunctional life, including sexual abuse by her stepfather and foster parents. At one point, Vanessa shows Bob a photo she keeps in her wallet of her biological father (whose picture, unbeknownst to her, is of mass murderer Richard Speck).

That evening, Bob attacks Vanessa, revealing he is the "I-5 Killer". She turns the tables on him, however, and shoots him several times before escaping. Going to a local restaurant, her blood-stained appearance prompts the owners to call 9-1-1. As she leaves the restaurant, Vanessa is arrested and questioned by police detectives, Mike Breer and Garnet Wallace, who write her off as a carjacker, even though she insists Bob had tried to kill her and had told her about his crimes.

Bob survives, but the bullet wounds have left him severely handicapped and facially disfigured. Vanessa is put on trial; Bob is portrayed as an innocent victim with no criminal record, whereas Vanessa has a long string of prior offenses. Vanessa goes to prison, while Bob and his socialite wife Mimi, who knows nothing of his crimes, are treated like heroes.

Initially scared, Vanessa makes friends in prison that include heroin-addicted lesbian Rhonda and Mesquita, a brutal Hispanic gang leader. Vanessa plots to escape to her grandmother's house and fashions a shiv from a toothbrush, a skill she had learned from her stepfather. During their transport to a new maximum security prison, Vanessa and Mesquita escape after killing a security guard, and they go their separate ways.

Re-examining evidence, the detectives realize Vanessa was telling the truth. They search Bob's home and find violent child pornography and human remains in a storage shed. Horrified, Mimi commits suicide. Evading the police at his home, Bob travels to Vanessa's grandmother's trailer, using the address written on a picture Vanessa had showed him.

Posing as a prostitute, Vanessa steals a car from a prospective john, driving to the trailer. She finds Bob in bed wearing her grandmother's nightgown and nightcap with the covers pulled up to his nose. He reveals himself and Vanessa sees her grandmother's dead body on the floor. A struggle ensues, culminating in her strangling him. Breer and Wallace arrive, finding the bodies of Bob and Vanessa's grandmother. Outside, Vanessa sits in a chair in a daze, then asks the detectives if they have a cigarette. They all smile and laugh.

Cast
 Kiefer Sutherland as Robert “Bob” Wolverton
 Reese Witherspoon as Vanessa Julia Lutz
 Wolfgang Bodison as Detective Mike Breer
 Dan Hedaya as Detective Garnet Wallace
 Amanda Plummer as Ramona Lutz
 Brooke Shields as Mimi Wolverton
 Michael T. Weiss as Larry
 Bokeem Woodbine as Chopper Wood
 Guillermo Díaz as Flacco
 Brittany Murphy as Rhonda
 Alanna Ubach as Mesquita
 Susan Barnes as Mrs. Cullins
 Conchata Ferrell as Mrs. Sheets
 Tara Subkoff as Sharon
 Julie Araskog as Prosecutor
 Lorna Raver as Judge
 Paul Perri as Cop #1

Release 
Freeway premiered at the Sundance Film Festival on January 26, 1996 where it was nominated for the Grand Jury Prize.

Censorship 
In Australia, when Columbia TriStar Home Video submitted a VHS of the original 104-minute print of the film to the Australian Classification Board (then known as the Office of Film and Literature Classification), it was refused classification. The ACB had already approved of a censored version, running 102 minutes, that removed two scenes: one in which Sutherland asks Witherspoon for anal sex on top of his excessive use of obscenities, and another in which a deceased 91-year-old grandmother is shown with a vase covering her private parts and her legs spread apart; the cut version remains available on video in that country, where it is rated R18+.

Critical reception
On the review aggregator website Rotten Tomatoes, the film holds an approval rating of 77% based on 43 reviews. The website's critical consensus reads, "A modern update on the tale of Little Red Riding Hood, Freeway is an audacious black comedy with a star-making performance from the young Reese Witherspoon." On Metacritic, which assigns a normalized rating to reviews, the film had a weighted average score of 61 out of 100, based on 15 critics, indicating "generally favorable reviews."

Critics lauded the film's hard-edged satire and performances. Film critic Roger Ebert gave Freeway three and a half stars out of four and stated, "like it or hate it (or both), you have to admire its skill, and the over-the-top virtuosity of Reese Witherspoon and Kiefer Sutherland." It received "Two Thumbs Up" on Siskel and Ebert At the Movies. Joe Baltake of The Sacramento Bee gave Freeway four stars out of four and called it "a wild, audacious drive-in attraction that takes the 'high' from 'highbrow' and the 'low' from 'lowdown' and shakes them up". Mick LaSalle of the San Francisco Chronicle gave Freeway four stars out of four and said that it was "rude in the way the truth is rude—only funnier". Margaret A. McGurk wrote for The Cincinnati Enquirer that "I didn't particularly want to like Freeway, but I couldn't help myself. Reese Witherspoon made me."

Sequel
A sequel titled Freeway II: Confessions of a Trickbaby was released in 1999, but was largely disregarded and released direct-to-video.

References

External links

Freeway on Tubi
Refused Classification Censorship details of Freeway.

1996 films
1996 comedy-drama films
1996 crime drama films
1996 crime thriller films
1996 directorial debut films
1996 independent films
1996 LGBT-related films
1990s black comedy films
1990s comedy thriller films
1990s crime comedy-drama films
1990s exploitation films
1990s prison films
1990s road comedy-drama films
1990s serial killer films
American black comedy films
American comedy thriller films
American crime comedy-drama films
American crime thriller films
American exploitation films
American independent films
American LGBT-related films
American prison films
American road comedy-drama films
American serial killer films
Films based on Little Red Riding Hood
Films directed by Matthew Bright
Films produced by Oliver Stone
Films scored by Danny Elfman
Films set in California
Incest in film
Films with screenplays by Matthew Bright
LGBT-related black comedy films
Republic Pictures films
The Kushner-Locke Company films
Women in prison films
1990s English-language films
1990s American films
Censored films